Bamby Salcedo is a Mexican-American transgender activist and the founder of the Los Angeles-based TransLatin@ Coalition, which according to its website "is an organization form[ed] by Trans Latin@ immigrant leaders who have come together in 2009 to organize and advocate for the needs of Trans Latin@s who are immigrants and reside in the US."

In 2014 the documentary Transvisible: Bamby Salcedo's Story was released. Also that year ColorLines recognized Salcedo as one of "14 Women of Color Who Rocked 2014". She was also honored that year at Lambda Legal's West Coast Liberty Awards for her work in Angels of Change, which is an organization that provides health care services for trans youth.

In 2015 Salcedo organized a demonstration of over one hundred transgender activists, who disrupted the opening session of the National LGBTQ Task Force's annual conference to protest violence against transgender people. This demonstration came after the deaths of several transgender people in Los Angeles; those deaths were publicized by demonstrations organized by Salcedo and the TransLatin@ Coalition. In 2015, OUT magazine recognized Salcedo as one of their OUT100 pioneers of the year.

In 2015, Salcedo resigned from her position as Health Education and HIV Prevention Services Coordinator at Children's Hospital Los Angeles.

In 2016, Salcedo spoke at The White House as part of the White House United State of Women Summit.

In 2018, TransLatin@ Coalition was joined beside Laverne Cox in the Los Angeles rally for the #FamiliesBelongTogether National Day of Action, demanding justice for detained migrant families separated by the U.S government at the U.S / Mexico border.

Awards 
James Earl Hardy Legends Award, The Black & Hispanic Gay Coalition
The West Coast Liberty Awards, Lambda Legal
Susan J. Hyde Award for 'Longevity in the Movement' from The National LGBTQ Task Force
Good Neighbor Award, State Farm Insurance
Connie Norman Leadership Award, LA PRIDE
Shiela J. Kuehl Trailblazer Award, Stonewall Democratic Club
The Women in Leadership Award, City of West Hollywood
Virginia Uribe Leadership Award, The Models of Pride Youth Conference
The Sol Award, National Latin@ AIDS Awareness Day (NLAAD)

References

American LGBT rights activists
Living people
Transgender women
LGBT Hispanic and Latino American people
Year of birth missing (living people)
21st-century LGBT people